Sérgio Pereira Couto (born 6 March 1967) is a  Portuguese-Brazilian writer. He has worked for publications including  Ciência Criminal, Discovery Magazine, PC Brasil, Geek!, Galileu, Planeta.

Works

Fiction 
Sociedades Secretas
Investigação Criminal
Os Heróis de Esparta
Renascimento
Sociedades Secretas – O Submundo
Help – a Lenda de um Beatlemaníaco
Jogos Criminais
Histórias do Tarô
Jogos Criminais 2
Anno Domini 2
A Batalha dos Deuses

Non fiction 
Sociedades Secretas: A Verdade Sobre o Código da Vinci
Decifrando a Fortaleza Digital
Sociedades Secretas: Maçonaria
Sociedades Secretas: Templários
Dicionário Secreto da Maçonaria
A História Secreta dos Piratas
Evangelho de Judas e Outros Mistérios
A História Secreta de Roma
Seitas Secretas
Maçonaria Para Não-Iniciados
Dossiê Hitler
A Incrível História da Bíblia
Desvendando o Egito
Os Segredos do Nazismo
Segredos e Lendas do Rock'''A Extraordinária História da ChinaCódigos e Cifras – da Antiguidade à Era ModernaSegredos da CabalaAs Dez Sociedades Mais Influentes da HistóriaSociedades Secretas: IlluminatiOs Segredos das Investigações CriminaisHitler e os Segredos do Nazismo vols. 1 e 2Segredos da BruxariaAlmanaque das GuerrasDecifrando o Símbolo PerdidoManual de Investigação ForenseDesvendando a MaçonariaDossiê John Lennon2012 X NostradamusArquivos Secretos do VaticanoO Homem Que Previa o FuturoAlmanaque das Sociedades SecretasWikiLeaks: Segredos, Informações e Poder'' (with José Antonio Domingos)

References

1967 births
Living people
Brazilian male writers
Brazilian journalists
Portuguese male writers
Portuguese journalists
Male journalists
Writers from São Paulo